Bodwesango is a village in the Adansi North district, a district in the Ashanti Region of Ghana.

Education
Bodwesango is known for the Bodwesango Senior High School. The school is a second cycle institution.

Healthcare
The Saint Louis General Hospital is located in Bodwesango.

References

External links
 Adansi North District
Adansi North District - Google Map

Populated places in the Ashanti Region